Bismuth subgallate, with a chemical formula C7H5BiO6, is commonly used to treat malodor by deodorizing flatulence and stools. In the United States, it (bismuth subgallate) is the active ingredient in Devrom (internal deodorant), an over-the-counter FDA-approved medicine.  Also, it has been used to treat Helicobacter pylori infection and is used in wound therapy.  As an internal deodorant, it is commonly used by individuals who have had gastrointestinal stoma surgery, bariatric surgery, fecal incontinence, and irritable bowel syndrome.

Also, a double blind study in 1974 reported its effectiveness as a flatulence/stool deodorant in ileostomy patients.

Adverse effects
It can cause darkening of the tongue and stools, which is temporary.

In 1974, a reversible encephalopathy was noted and examined in four colon cancer patients taking bismuth subgallate after abdominoperineal resection.

Bismuth subgallate is contraindicated in case of hypersensitivity to the substance, and should be used with caution in people with liver disease or kidney disease. It is grouped in pregnancy category C (risk not ruled out: Animal reproduction studies have shown an adverse effect on the fetus and there are no adequate and well-controlled studies in humans, but potential benefits may warrant use of the drug in pregnant women despite potential risks). During lactation, very little bismuth subgallate passes over to the child.

Structure 

Crystal structure determination of bismuth subgallate revealed it is a coordination polymer with the formula [Bi(C6H2(O)3COOH)(H2O)]n2nH2O. The phenolate oxygen atoms of the gallate ligand chelate to bismuth cations and form chains. The material is nanoporous and the open-channels can be filled with small gas molecules such as carbon dioxide.

See also 
 Bismuth
 Gallic acid

External links 
 American Cancer Society: Ileostomy Guide 
 Cleveland Clinic-Having an Ileostomy– A Primer for New Ostomates 
 The Ostomy Files:The Issue of Oral Medications and a Fecal Ostomy 
 Devrom website

References 

Drugs acting on the gastrointestinal system and metabolism
Bismuth compounds
Coordination polymers